Anomomorpha lecanorina is a species of lichen in the family Graphidaceae. The specific epithet lecanorina denotes the similarity of its fruit bodies to those of the genus Lecanora.

References

Lichen species
Lichens described in 2011
Lichens of Ecuador
Graphidaceae
Taxa named by Harrie Sipman